Defending champion Chris Evert defeated Martina Navratilova in the final, 2–6, 6–3, 6–3 to win the women's singles tennis title at the 1986 French Open. It was her seventh French Open singles title and her 18th and final major singles title overall, an Open Era record. It also marked the 13th consecutive year in which Evert won a major, another Open Era record. The final between Evert and Navratilova was their third successive final at the French Open.

Seeds
The seeded players are listed below. Chris Evert is the champion; others show the round in which they were eliminated.

Qualifying

Draw

Finals

Earlier rounds

Section 1

Section 2

Section 3

Section 4

Section 5

Section 6

Section 7

Section 8

See also
 Evert–Navratilova rivalry

References

External links
1986 French Open – Women's draws and results at the International Tennis Federation

Women's Singles
French Open by year – Women's singles
French Open - Women's Singles
1986 in women's tennis
1986 in French women's sport